Thomas J. Jordan (born 1963) is a Swiss economist and central banker. He is the chairman of the governing board of the Swiss National Bank, chairman of the Central Bank Counterfeit Deterrence Group, a member of the board of directors of the Bank for International Settlements, and a member of the steering committee of the Financial Stability Board.

Jordan was born on 28 January 1963, in the city of Biel/Bienne. He studied economics and business studies at the University of Bern, completing his degree in 1989 and his doctorate in 1993. He wrote a post-doctoral thesis, on the subject of European Monetary Union and predicting the sovereign debt crisis and also the bank failures that eventually transpired, during three years he spent as a researcher at Harvard University in the United States. He was appointed a lecturer at the University of Bern in 1998, and an honorary professor in 2003. 
Jordan joined the Swiss National Bank as an economic advisor in 1997, and progressed through various roles. He joined the governing board as an alternate member in 2004 and became a full member in 2007. He was appointed chairman on 18 April 2012, following the resignation of Philipp Hildebrand from that role.

References 

1963 births
Living people
Chairmen of the Board of Swiss National Bank
Swiss economists